This is a list of technology centers throughout the world.  Government planners and business networks often incorporate "silicon" or "valley" into place names to describe their own areas as a result of the success of Silicon Valley in California. Metrics may be applied to measure qualitative differences between these places, including:

 How much and to what extent public and/or private research and development (R&D) funds are spent in the zones
 What percentage of local employment is technology related
 If the zone is mainly government funded or is mainly corporate driven (or is it a mix of both)
 If mainly corporate, how much revenue and profit and which corporations have headquarters there
 If mainly corporate, how much venture capital has been made available to companies in the zone
 What supporting higher educational institutions (e.g., universities or colleges) are located in nearby

Globally prominent clusters 

 Silicon Valley: Originating in Stanford University (Palo Alto and Menlo Park), and spreading south towards San Jose, California, and suburbs. San Francisco and nearby areas including Berkeley and Oakland are technically not part of Silicon Valley but have seen growth in industries such as web development since the 90s and venture capital.  Silicon Valley, home to two of the largest Big Tech companies, Apple and Google, has maintained dominance for decades in core industries such as microprocessor development as well as software and apps development
Greater Seattle: one of the largest tech clusters in the world, home to two of the largest & wealthiest Big Tech companies: Microsoft and Amazon, as well as Boeing, Nintendo, and most other major tech players have significant presence and research centers in Greater Seattle. University of Washington and Puget Sound vicinity is also home to a large numbers of notable companies & startups in Life Sciences, biotechnology, medical, video/online game, aerospace, aviation, fintech, technology investment, funds, venture capital, as well as various research & technology centers
 Cambridge Cluster: The name given to the region around Cambridge, England, which is home to a large cluster of high-tech businesses focusing on software, electronics and biotechnology, among others AstraZeneca. Many of these businesses have connections with the University of Cambridge, and the area is now one of the most important technology centres in Europe
IT cluster Rhine-Main-Neckar, Germany: Europe's largest software cluster, is globally dominant in business software, IT security research and biopharmaceuticals
Shenzhen-Hong Kong Greater Bay Area: Asia's largest technology cluster, is globally dominant in tech manufacturing, consumer software, research, serving global and largest tech consumer market. Home to some of the largest global tech companies, such as Tencent and others
 Geneva, Switzerland is globally dominant in particle physics at CERN and various frontier scientific & technology research
 Greater Shanghai, including Hangzhou and others in Yangtze River Delta, is globally dominant technology cluster with companies such as Alibaba, Apple, Amazon and Tesla global manufacturing
 Dulles Technology Corridor is globally dominant in telecom, satellite, and defense industries
 Hsinchu Science Park: Greater Hsinchu City and Hsinchu County, Taiwan is the dominant area worldwide for pure-play semiconductor foundry market
 Silicon Alley is a portion of Manhattan, New York City, that encompasses Broadway, the Flatiron District, SoHo, and TriBeCa technology centers
 Silicon Wadi: An area with a high concentration of high-tech industries in the coastal plain in Israel. 
Eindhoven, The Netherlands is a leading area in technology, stems from Eindhoven University of Technology and Philips.

List

Africa
 Cameroon
 Silicon Mountain: most innovative startups in Buea

 Egypt
 Smart Village Egypt: part of Greater Cairo
Maadi technology Park

 Kenya
 Konza Technology City: launched in 2013, and set to host business process outsourcing (BPO) ventures, a science park, and other facilities

 Mauritius
 Ebene Cyber City

 Morocco
 Casablanca: Casablanca Technopark

Nigeria
 Lagos: Yabacon Valley

 South Africa
 Silicon Cape, Western Cape
 Technopark Stellenbosch, Stellenbosch

 Zambia
 National Technology Business Centre (NTBC): Lusaka

Middle East and North Africa
  United Arab Emirates 
 Dubai Silicon Oasis

Americas
  Bolivia 
 Urubó (Santa Cruz de la Sierra)

  Brazil 
 Florianópolis
 Campinas, São Paulo, São José dos Campos, São Carlos: The Silicon Valley of Brazil
 Porto Digital: Recife

 Canada 
 Canada's Technology Triangle with Kitchener-Waterloo, Ontario: home to BlackBerry (formerly Research in Motion), Open Text, Kik Messenger, Desire2Learn, and the Canadian head office of Google; home to the Communitech HUB start-up incubator
 Greater Vancouver, British Columbia: home to Sony Pictures Imageworks, PMC-Sierra, Telus, Hootsuite, EA Canada, Vision Critical, MacDonald, Dettwiler and Associates, Westport Innovations, Slack Technologies, Teradici and D-Wave Systems
 Markham, Ontario: home to the Canadian head offices of Sony, Avaya, IBM, Motorola, Toshiba, Lucent, Sun Microsystems, Apple, American Express and AMD Graphics Product Group
 Silicon Valley North: the National Capital Region around Ottawa, Ontario, Bayview Yards,—home to Mitel, Shopify, DragonWave, Alcatel Lucent, and Halogen Software
 Greater Toronto Area: specifically Mississauga and Brampton
 Cité Multimédia, Montreal
 Technoparc Montreal
 Chile 
 Parque Científico y Tecnológico Laguna Carén, Pudahuel, Santiago
 Parque Científico y Tecnológico Pacyt Bío Bío, Concepción
 Centro Antártico Internacional, Punta Arenas
 Centro Interdisciplinario de Neurociencia de Valparaíso, Valparaíso
 Guatemala 
 Guatemala City

 Mexico 
 Guadalajara 
Mexico City
Monterrey
Querétaro
Tijuana
Cancún

 United States 
 Automation Alley: Metropolitan Detroit, primarily Oakland County, Michigan
 Cummings Research Park: Huntsville, Alabama
 Denver Tech Center: Denver, Colorado
 Dulles Technology Corridor: Northern Virginia near Washington Dulles Airport
 Greater Seattle
 Golden Corridor: Near Chicago's O'Hare International Airport and Northwest Suburbs
 Greater Reno, Nevada
 Illinois Technology and Research Corridor: DuPage County, Illinois
 New Mexico Technology Corridor: Los Alamos to Las Cruces, centered on Albuquerque metropolitan area
 Optics Valley: Tucson, Arizona
 Research Triangle: Raleigh–Durham–Chapel Hill, North Carolina, centered on Research Triangle Park
 Route 128: Eastern Massachusetts
 Silicon Alley: New York City
 Silicon Beach: Playa Vista in West Los Angeles
 Silicon Hills: Austin, Texas and its suburbs
 Silicon Forest: Portland, Oregon
 Silicon Peach: Atlanta 
 Silicon Prairie: Metropolitan Dallas (primarily the northern region and its suburbs)
 Silicon Slopes: Salt Lake City, Utah including Utah County (Provo, Utah) and Summit County (Park City, Utah) and surrounding areas.
 Silicon Speedway: Indianapolis, Indiana 
 Silicon Valley
 Tech Coast: broadly Southern California, Silicon Beach refers to emergent Santa Monica–LAX tech cluster.
 Tech Valley: The Capital District area of Albany, New York
 Telecom Corridor (an area in the Silicon Prairie): Richardson, suburb of Dallas, Texas
 Texas Medical Center: Houston, Texas

  Uruguay 
 Zonamerica, Metropolitan Area of Montevideo: The Silicon Valley of Uruguay
 Parque de las Ciencias, Canelones, Canelones, Uruguay
 WTC Montevideo, Buceo, Montevideo
 Aguada Park, Aguada, Montevideo

Asia

 China
 Jing-Jin-Ji: Beijing-Tianjin-Shijiazhuang Hi-Tech Industrial Belt
 Zhongguancun, Haidian District, Beijing
 Chengdu, Sichuan: Chengdu Tianfu Software Park
 Dalian, Liaoning: Dalian Hi-tech Zone, Dalian Software Park
 Shenyang: Hunnan New Area
 Shenzhen: Shenzhen Hi-Tech Industrial Park
 Shanghai: Zhangjiang Hi-Tech Park

 Hong Kong
 Cyberport: Hong Kong Island
 Hong Kong Science Park: New Territories

 India

 Software Technology Parks of India
 Bangalore: Electronics City, International Tech Park, Bangalore, Manyata Embassy Business Park: Bangalore
 Delhi IT Park : Delhi
 Pune: Cyber City, Hinjawadi, Magarpatta
 HITEC City: Hyderabad
 Knowledge Corridor: between Pune and Mumbai
 Cyber City, Gurgaon, Haryana: near Delhi
Salt Lake Sector V: Kolkata, West Bengal
 Noida, Uttar Pradesh: DLF IT Park
 Chennai: IT Corridor, Mahindra World City, New Chennai, DLF SEZ, Automotive Corridor, EMS Corridor, SEZ Corridor, Chennai ITIR, Entertainment Corridor, SIPCOT IT Park, Tidel Park, Olympia Tech Park, International Tech Park, Chennai, Ramanujan IT City, Ambattur Industrial Estate, Guindy Industrial Estate, World Trade Center, Cybervale, EPIP, Irungattukottai Industrial Park, Sriperumbudur Industrial Park, Oragadam Industrial Growth Center, Ennore SEZ
 Sricity, Andhra Pradesh: near Tirupati
 Genome Valley: Hyderabad
 IT City, Lucknow
 MIHAN: Nagpur
 Cyberabad: Hyderabad
Bhubaneswar: Infovalley, Odisha Biotech Park 

 Indonesia
 Bandung Techno Park, Bandung, West Java
 Cimahi Techno Park, Cimahi, West Java, Indonesia
 Solo Techno Park, Surakarta, Central Java, Indonesia
 Batam 
 Jakarta
 Malang
 Yogyakarta

 Iran

 Pardis Technology Park in Pardis, Iran's Silicon Valley

 Israel
 Tel Aviv/Mediterranean Coastal Region: referred to as Silicon Wadi, an area with a high concentration of high-tech industries in the coastal plain in Israel. Israel as a whole country has a strong high-tech sector. The Silicon Wadi area covers much of the country, although especially high concentrations of hi-tech industry can be found in Tel Aviv and its metropolitan area, known as Gush Dan, including small clusters around the cities of Ra'anana, Petah Tikva, Herzliya, Netanya, the academic city of Rehovot and its neighbor Rishon LeZion. In addition, hi-tech clusters can be found in Haifa and Caesarea. Jerusalem also has significant high-tech establishments (Technology Park, Malha, Har Hotzvim and JVP Media Quarter in Talpiot). Another notable high-tech park is the Startup Village in Yokneam Illit. Yehud hosts Hewlett-Packard Enterprise's software campus and other IT and high-tech companies.

 Japan
 Kansai Science City (Keihanna Science City), on the borders of Kyoto, Osaka and Nara Prefectures
 Tsukuba Science City, Tsukuba City, Ibaraki Prefecture
 Yokosuka Research Park (YRP), Yokosuka City, Kanagawa Prefecture

 Malaysia
 Technology Park Malaysia (TPM), Kuala Lumpur
 Multimedia Super Corridor (MSC) / Cyberjaya, Selangor
 Selangor Science Park, Selangor
 Selangor Science Park 2, Selangor
 Subang Hi-Tech Industrial Park, Selangor
 FRIM-MTDC Technology Centre, Selangor
 UPM-MTDC Technology Centre, Selangor
 UKM-MTDC Technology Centre. Selangor
 UITM-MTDC Technology Centre. Selangor
 Penang (Known as "Silicon Valley of the East") 
 Penang Science Park, Penang
 Penang Cybercity, Penang
 MSC Cyberport, Johor
 Johor Technology Park, Johor
 Nusajaya Tech Park, Johor
 UTM-MTDC Technology Centre, Technovation Park, Universiti Teknologi Malaysia Johor
 Kulim Hi-Tech Park (KHTP), Kedah

 Myanmar

 Yadanabon Cyber City

 Pakistan
 National Science and Technology Park (NSTP)
 Arfa Karim Technology Park (former Software Technology Park): Lahore
 IT Media City: Karachi
 National Science Park: Islamabad
 Software Technology Park (1, 2, 3)

 Philippines
 Light Industry and Science Park of the Philippines I & II, Laguna
 Light Industry and Science Park of the Philippines III, Batangas
 Light Industry and Science Park of the Philippines III, Batangas
 Light Industry and Science Park of the Philippines IV, Bataan
 Cebu Light Industry Park, Cebu
 Science City of Muñoz, Nueva Ecija
 Calamba Premiere International Park

 Qatar
 Qatar Science & Technology Park, Ar Rayyan

 Saudi Arabia
 Riyadh Techno Valley, Riyadh
 Dhahran Techno-Valley, Dhahran
 King Abdulaziz City for Science and Technology, Riyadh

 Singapore
 Singapore Science Park The southwestern corner of Singapore

 South Korea
 Daedeok Science Town, Daejeon
 Digital Media City, Seoul
 LG Science Park, Seoul
 Pangyo Techno Valley, Gyeonggi
 Samsung Town, Seoul
 Gumi Technology Industrial Park, Gumi, North Gyeongsang
 Pohang University of Science and Technology, Pohang, North Gyeongsang
 Songdo, Incheon
 Teheran Valley, Seoul

 Taiwan

 Central Taiwan Science Park: Changhua County, Nantou County, Taichung City and Yunlin County
 Southern Taiwan Science Park: Kaohsiung City and Tainan City
 Nankang Software Park: Taipei City
 Neihu High Tech Science Park: Taipei City

 Thailand
 Thailand Science Park, north of Bangkok
 Software Park Thailand, Bangkok

 United Arab Emirates
 Dubai Internet City, Dubai
 Dubai Silicon Oasis, Dubai
 Dubai Media City, Dubai
 Masdar City, Abu Dhabi

 Uzbekistan
 IT-Park, Tashkent

 Vietnam
 Hoa Lac Hi-tech Park, Hanoi
 Saigon Hi-Tech Park
 Danang Hi-tech Park

Europe
 Austria
 Softwarepark Hagenberg: Hagenberg, Upper Austria
 VRVis Research Center: Vienna

 Belarus
 Belarus High Technologies Park: Minsk

 Belgium
 BioWin: The Health Cluster of Wallonia

 Bulgaria
 Sofia Tech Park: Sofia

 Czech Republic
 South Moravian Innovation Centre: Brno
 Vědeckotechnický park (Plzeň)

 Finland
 Otaniemi: near Helsinki

 France
 Paris-Saclay
 GIANT: Grenoble (nanotechnology, particle physics, bioscience and renewable energy)
 Metz Science Park: Metz Technopole
 Toulouse: Toulouse Sud-Est: Agrobiopole, Labège-Innopole, Aerospace Valley
 Valbonne: Sophia Antipolis
 Villeneuve-d'Ascq: Technopôle Lille Métropole
 Rennes: Atalante

 Germany

IT-Cluster Rhein-Main-Neckar, Frankfurt Rhine-Main and Rhine-Neckar
Berlin: known as Silicon Allee, one of Europe's most dynamic technology, IT and startup centers
 Dresden (Silicon Saxony)
 Kaiserslautern (Silicon Woods)
 Dortmund (Ruhr Valley)
 Karlsruhe
 Mecklenburg-Western Pomerania: BioCon Valley for its life science and biotechnology clusters
 Munich (Isar Valley)
 Western Pomerania (IT Lagoon)
 WISTA (Science and Technology Park in Berlin-Adlershof)
 Hungary
 : Budapest
 Ireland
 Dublin (known as "Silicon Docks" or "The European Silicon Valley", due to its high number of technological EMEA centres)

 Italy
 Apple iOS Developer Academy: Naples
 FabriQ: Milan
 AREA Science Park: Trieste
 Milano Innovation District called "MIND" (Former Expo Area) in Milan 
 : Venezia

 Netherlands
 Amsterdam Science Park: Amsterdam
 Biotech Campus Delft: Delft
 Delftechpark: Delft
 High Tech Campus Eindhoven: Eindhoven
 Leiden Bio Science Park: Leiden and Oegstgeest
 Novio Tech Campus: Nijmegen
 Technopolis Innovation Park Delft: Delft
 Utrecht Science Park: Utrecht
 Zernike Campus: Groningen

 Portugal
 Taguspark
 Instituto Pedro Nunes: Coimbra

 Russia
 Akademgorodok, Novosibirsk
 Skolkovo Innovation Center, Skolkovo, Moscow Oblast
 Skolkovo Institute of Science and Technology
 Innopolis, near Kazan'

 Romania
 Bucharest
 Grozăvești including Politehnica Campus, Regie Campus, Sema Park, Afi Park and Orhideea Offices 
 Pipera including Pipera Park, Aviației Offices and Piața Pipera Offices
 Măgurele including the European laser technology institute
 Romexpo including Expozitiei Offices, Tipografiei Offices and Jiului Offices
 Militari including West Gate Offices
 Cluj-Napoca
 Între Lacuri start-up offices
 Jucu technology park
 Iași
 Palas-Sfântul Andrei Offices
 Craiova
 S200 technology park including Universitatea Campus
 Ford automotive park
 Timișoara
 Openville
 Vox Technology Park
 Pitești
 Dacia automotive park

 Serbia
 Science Technology Park Belgrade
 NTP Novi Sad

 Slovakia
 Kosice IT Valley: Košice

 Spain
 Bizkaia Science and Technology Park: Biscay
 22@: Barcelona
 Andalusia Technology Park: Málaga
 Cartuja 93: Seville

 Sweden
 Kista: Stockholm
 Ideon Science Park: Lund
 Mjärdevi Science Park: Linköping

 Switzerland
 Crypto Valley: Zug

 Turkey
 ITU Arı Technopolis: (Istanbul)
 METU Technopolis: Ankara
 Hacettepe Technopolis: Ankara
 IT Valley (Turkish: Bilişim Vadisi)

 United Kingdom
 Oxford Science Park: Oxford
 Silicon Corridor: M4 corridor, Reading, Berkshire
 Silicon Fen: Cambridge
 Silicon Glen: in Central Scotland
 Silicon Gorge: Bristol
 Silicon Roundabout: London
 Silicon Spa: Leamington Spa
Cambridge Norwich Tech Corridor

 Ukraine

 UNIT.city: Kyiv

 Uzbekistan

 IT PARK Headquarters: Tashkent

Oceania
 Australia
 Australian Technology Park, Eveleigh, Sydney, New South Wales
 Digital Harbour, Docklands, Melbourne, Victoria
 Macquarie Park, Sydney, New South Wales (including the Research Park, Macquarie University)
 Technology Park, Bentley, Perth, Western Australia (adjacent to Curtin University)

Places with "Silicon" names
The following list contains places with "Silicon" names, that is, places with nicknames inspired by the Silicon Valley nickname given to part of the San Francisco Bay Area:

Africa
 Silicon Cape: Cape Town, South Africa
 Silicon Lagoon: Lagos, Nigeria
 Silicon Mountain: Buea, Cameroon
 Silicon Savannah: Nairobi, Kenya

Middle East and North Africa
 Dubai Silicon Oasis: Dubai, United Arab Emirates
 Silicon Wadi, Israel

Americas

Brazil
 Brazilian Silicon Valley: Campinas, Brazil

Canada
 Canada's Technology Triangle: Waterloo, Ontario, a growing technology centre hub started by the creation of BlackBerry. 
 Silicon Valley North: Ottawa, Ontario, Canada's largest concentration of technology companies and technology employees.
 Silicon Vineyard: Okanagan Valley, British Columbia

Chile
 Chilecon Valley: Santiago, Chile. The name was first coined by The Economist. Santiago is home of Start-Up Chile, the most important government sponsored accelerator worldwide.

Costa Rica
 Silicon Paradise: Southern Nicoya Peninsula: Santa Teresa de Cobano, Delicias, Montezuma.

Mexico
 Mexican Silicon Valley/Silicon Valley South: Jalisco, Mexico
 Silicon Border: Mexicali, Mexico

United States
 Philicon Valley (also known as "Silicon Valley Forge"): Area close to Philadelphia, in the suburbs of Valley Forge and Wayne
Research Forest: The Woodlands, Texas
 Silicon Alley: Originally a portion of Manhattan in New York City, specifically Broadway, the Flatiron District, SoHo, and TriBeCa. Now encompasses the general NYC tech sphere.
 Silicon Anchor: Norfolk, Va–Virginia Beach metropolitan area
 Silicon Basin: Columbus, Ohio 
 Silicon Bayou: New Orleans, Louisiana
 Silicon Beach: Santa Monica, California and the Westside area of the Los Angeles metro, more specifically Culver City, Venice Beach, Westwood, Manhattan Beach, Malibu, Playa del Rey, and Marina del Rey; also used to refer to the San Diego area in the name of the 1980s software developer Silicon Beach Software. There is also Silicon Beach in South Florida in the Miami area.
 Silicon Coast: Orange County, California
 Silicon Desert: Chandler, Arizona
 Silicon Forest: Portland, Oregon
 Silicon Harbor: Charleston, South Carolina
 Silicon Hill: Washington, D.C.
 Silicon Hills: Austin, Texas
 Silicon Hollar: Boone, North Carolina
 Silicon Mountain: Front Range Urban Corridor, Colorado (Denver, Boulder, Fort Collins, Colorado Springs)
 Silicon Peach: Atlanta home to Georgia Institute of Technology as well as VMware Airwatch, Google ATL, Kabbage, Pindrop Security, and many venture capital firms
 Silicon Prairie
 Dallas-Fort Worth Silicon Prairie: Dallas-Fort Worth Metroplex, Texas
 Illinois Silicon Prairie: Chicago and Urbana–Champaign
 Midwest Silicon Prairie: Omaha, St. Louis, Des Moines, Kansas City
 Wyoming Silicon Prairie, also called the "Silicon Range": Jackson Hole
 Silicon Sandbar: Cape Cod, Massachusetts
 Silicon Shire: Eugene, Oregon
 Silicon Shore: Santa Barbara, California
 Silicon Slopes: Utah County and southern Salt Lake County, Utah
 Silicon Surf: Santa Cruz, California
Silicon Valley: San Jose, California (the original "Silicon" namesake)
 Silicon Valley North: Seattle, Washington
 Silicon Valley of the Sierras: Nevada County, California
 Silicotton Valley: Huntsville, Alabama
 Silicon Spuds: Idaho Falls, Idaho

Asia
 Silicon Harbor: Hong Kong, China
 Silicon Island: Kyushu, Japan
 Silicon Peninsula: Dalian, China
 China's Silicon Valley: Shenzhen or Zhongguancun, Haidian District, Beijing, People's Republic of China (PRC).
 Silicon Valley of India (sometimes referred to as Silicon Plateau): Bangalore
 Silicon Valley of Taiwan: Hsinchu, Taiwan
 Silicon Valley of Hong Kong: Cyberport and Hong Kong Science Park
 Silicon Valley of the East: Bayan Lepas Free Industrial Zone, Penang, Malaysia
 Silicon Wadi: The coastal plain of Israel, stretching from Haifa to Tel Aviv and Rehovot and expanding inland to Jerusalem
 Teheran Valley: Gangnam District, Seoul, South Korea

Europe

France
 Silicon Sentier: Paris, France

Germany

 BioCon Valley: Mecklenburg and Western Pomerania
 Isar Valley: Munich, Bavaria
 Medical Valley: Erlangen, Bavaria
 Silicon Allee: Berlin (incl. WISTA)
 Silicon Saxony: Dresden, Saxony, Elbe river valley around the city 
 Silicon Woods: Kaiserslautern, Rhineland-Palatinate

Greece
 Silicon Islands: Patras with past and present companies like Atmel, Samsung, Citrix, Dialog Semiconductor, Think Silicon and Intel

Ireland
 Silicon Docks: Dublin, Ireland. Contains the European headquarters of companies like Facebook, Twitter, Google, LinkedIn, and many others.

Norway
 SiliconFjord: Oslofjord region

Russia
 Russian Silicon Valley:
 Innopolis (Иннополис)
 Skolkovo innovation center
 Zelenograd, Moscow
 Silicon Sloboda: Moscow, Russia
 Silicon Taiga: Akademgorodok, Russia

Switzerland
 Ticino Valley: Technology cluster in the Lugano area

United Kingdom
 Cwm Silicon (Newport, Wales)
 Silicon Alley (Pink Lane, Newcastle Upon Tyne, England)
 Silicon Beach (Bournemouth, England)
 Silicon Canal (Birmingham, England): the area along the Digbeth Branch Canal from Aston Science Park, through Millennium Point to Digbeth.
 Silicon Corridor (the M4 corridor)
 Silicon Dock (Belfast)
 Silicon Fen (Cambridge, England)
 Silicon Forest (Newark, Nottinghamshire): Silicon Forest consists of various businesses from in and around the Newark and Sherwood area that specialise in technology and innovation.
 Silicon Glen (Central Belt, Scotland)
 Silicon Gorge (Bristol, England)
 Silicon Mall (London, England): the area between Pall Mall and Victoria in London
 Silicon Pier (Brighton, England)
 Silicon Roundabout: the area around Old Street Roundabout in London (East London Tech City)
 Silicon Shipyard (Newcastle upon Tyne, Gateshead, Middlesbrough)
 Silicon Spa (Leamington Spa, Warwickshire): Notable for a relatively high concentration of video game developers.
 Silicon Walk (Edinburgh, Scotland)

Oceania

Australia
 Silicon Mallee (Adelaide, Australia; Mallee, an Australian aboriginal word for the land area around Adelaide covered by low, scrubby dwarf eucalyptus "mallee" vegetation)
 Silicon St, Sydney" An inner city colloquial district including Ultimo/Pyrmont along Harris St spanning 10 km2 from UTS to Google including Fishburners
 Silicon Beach: A term used by those in the Australian startup community to refer to the startup ecosystem within Australian cities, in particular by Meetup groups like Silicon Beach Sydney and Silicon Beach Adelaide

New Zealand
 Silicon Welly (Wellington in New Zealand)

See also
 Technopole
 List of research parks
 Research-intensive clusters

References

Further reading
 Kerr, William R., and Frederic Robert-Nicoud. 2020. "Tech Clusters." Journal of Economic Perspectives, 34 (3): 50–76.

External links 
 Comprehensive list of "Silicon" names

 
Centers